Ronnie Edwards may refer to:

 Ronnie Edwards (politician) (1952–2016), member of the Louisiana House of Representatives
 Ronnie Edwards (footballer) (born 2003), English footballer
 Ronnie Claire Edwards (1933–2016), American actress
 Ronnie Edwards, editor and animator, see The Game Theorists